WCHW-FM (91.3 FM) is a high school radio station. Licensed to Bay City, Michigan, it first began broadcasting in 1973.  The station broadcasts in mono.  It broadcasts from a 124-foot antenna located at Central High School on Columbus Avenue in the east side of Bay City.

Programming on WCHW, generally an Album Oriented Rock format, is shared by students at Bay City Central High School and Bay City Western High School during the day on days when school is in session especially between the times of 9-10am. During nighttime hours, weekends and student holidays, programming from North Carolina's WCPE-FM can be heard instead.

References
Michiguide.com - WCHW-FM History

External links

CHW-FM
High school radio stations in the United States
Radio stations established in 1973
1973 establishments in Michigan